Stanislav Eduardovich Bogdanovich (4 February 1993 – 5 March 2020) was a Ukrainian chess player who also competed for Russia.

Early life 
Bogdanovich graduated from the National University Odesa Law Academy.

Chess career 
 Silver medalist at the UEFA European Under-12 Championship [2]
 Ukrainian Under-18 champion
 Champion of Odesa (2010)
 Ukrainian blitz champion (2013)

He was awarded the title of International Master in 2009, and Grandmaster in 2017.

Death 
Bogdanovich was found dead on 5 March 2020 in his Moscow apartment, alongside nitrous oxide-filled balloons and the body of his girlfriend, Alexandra Vernigora, also a chess player. Police did not suspect foul play. Other reports suggest that the couple were found with bags over their faces.  The incident happened a few days after an event where Bogdanovich competed for Russia against Ukraine.

References

External links

 
 
 Stanislav Bogdanovich chess games at 365Chess.com

1993 births
2020 deaths
Chess grandmasters
Ukrainian chess players
Sportspeople from Odesa
Odesa Law Academy alumni